Sir Hugh Malcolm Robinson  (12 February 1857 – 27 August 1933) was Chief Inspector of Factories of the British Government from 1917 to 1920.

Robinson was born in York, the son of Canon H. G. Robinson of York Minster. He was educated at Harrow School and New College, Oxford, and rowed in the Oxford eight in the University Boat Race of 1879.

Robinson was appointed an Inspector of Factories in 1882 and promoted to Deputy Chief Inspector in 1908 and Chief Inspector in 1917. He was appointed a Companion of the Imperial Service Order (ISO) in 1912, Companion of the Order of the Bath (CB) in 1918 and knighted in the 1920 New Year Honours shortly before his retirement.

See also
List of Oxford University Boat Race crews

Footnotes

References
Obituary, The Times, 30 August 1933

1857 births
1933 deaths
People from York
People educated at Harrow School
Alumni of New College, Oxford
English male rowers
Oxford University Boat Club rowers
Civil servants in the Home Office
Companions of the Imperial Service Order
Companions of the Order of the Bath
Knights Bachelor
Factory inspectors